Pogonoglossus is a genus of beetles in the family Carabidae, containing the following species:

 Pogonoglossus augustae Louwerens, 1949
 Pogonoglossus carinipennis Bates, 1892
 Pogonoglossus chaudoiri Gestro, 1875
 Pogonoglossus giganteus Baehr, 2005
 Pogonoglossus glabricollis Emden, 1937
 Pogonoglossus grossulus Darlington, 1968
 Pogonoglossus horni Sloane, 1907
 Pogonoglossus inarmatus Baehr, 1989
 Pogonoglossus inflaticeps (Sloane, 1904)
 Pogonoglossus intermedius Bouchard, 1903
 Pogonoglossus laevissimus Baehr, 1995
 Pogonoglossus latior Darlington, 1968
 Pogonoglossus latus Andrewes, 1937
 Pogonoglossus major Darlington, 1968
 Pogonoglossus minor Darlington, 1968
 Pogonoglossus missai Baehr, 2005
 Pogonoglossus montanus Bouchard, 1903
 Pogonoglossus obliquus Darlington, 1968
 Pogonoglossus papua Darlington, 1968
 Pogonoglossus parvus Darlington, 1968
 Pogonoglossus physoides Andrewes, 1937
 Pogonoglossus porosus (Sloane, 1904)
 Pogonoglossus punctulatus Louwerens, 1969
 Pogonoglossus rufopiceus Baehr, 1993
 Pogonoglossus schaumii Chaudoir, 1869
 Pogonoglossus sciurus Andrewes, 1937
 Pogonoglossus sumatrensis Gestro, 1875
 Pogonoglossus sylvaticus Bouchard, 1903
 Pogonoglossus tagalus Heller, 1916
 Pogonoglossus taylori Darlington, 1968
 Pogonoglossus torvus Andrewes, 1937
 Pogonoglossus truncatus (Schmidt-Goebel, 1846)
 Pogonoglossus unicolor (McLeay, 1886)
 Pogonoglossus validicornis Chaudoir, 1862

References

Anthiinae (beetle)